Mount Borcik is a prominent mountain,  high, standing  north-northwest of Mount Dietz in the southern Hays Mountains of the Queen Maud Mountains. It was mapped by the United States Geological Survey from surveys and from U.S. Navy air photos, 1960–64, and named by the Advisory Committee on Antarctic Names for Lieutenant Commander Andrew J. Borcik, a pilot on photographic flights during U.S. Navy Operation Deepfreeze, 1965–67.

References 

Mountains of the Ross Dependency
Amundsen Coast